DreamCypher is a 2007 album by The Crüxshadows, released on Dancing Ferret Discs.

Style and concept 
DreamCypher features cover and interior art by visual artist MANDEM, and interior art by Pawn Feral, Velma O'Neal, Steven Archer of Ego Likeness, Rogue, and Jessica Lackey.

Reception

Charts 
The first single from the CD, their 2006 single, Sophia, made its debut on the Billboard charts in the issue dated September 23, 2006. Sophia debuted at #1 on the Hot Dance Singles Sales chart, replacing Beyoncé in the top spot.  At the same time, it placed at #7 on the Hot 100 Singles Sales chart.  On both charts, Sophia was the highest-ranking debut entry that week. They hit the charts again with the Sophia single, as well as their new single, Birthday, on September 13, 2007. Birthday made #1 on the Hot Dance Singles Sales chart and #2 on the Hot 100 Singles Sales chart, while Sophia hit the charts again and made #3 and #23, respectively.

Track listing
All tracks by Rogue

 "Pygmalion's Dream" – 3:20
 "Windbringer" – 5:34
 "Sophia" –  6:46
 "Defender" – 5:50
 "Perfect" – 7:17
 "Elissa" – 6:30
 "Eye of the Storm" – 7:48
 "Ariadne" – 5:07
 "Sleepwalking" – 3:09
 "Solus" – 5:34
 "Dido's Reply" – 1:18
 "Memorare" – 7:24
 "Birthday" – 5:41
 "Kisses 3" – 2:08

Personnel
Rogue – lead vocals, violin, programming
Cassandra Luger - guitar
JoHanna Moresco - violin
Rachel McDonnell – keyboard, violin

References

2007 albums
The Crüxshadows albums